Tommy Dorsey (1937–1941) is an album released in Germany by Amiga featuring works by Tommy Dorsey & His Orchestra.

Track listing

Side A

Side B

Personnel
Arranger - Sy Oliver
Bass - Gene Traxler, Sid Weiss
Clarinet - Johnny Mince
Drums - Buddy Rich, Cliff Leeman, Dave Tough, Maurice Purtill
Guitar - Carmen Mastren, Clark Yocum
Liner Notes [1976] - Karlheinz Drechsel
Piano - Howard Smith, Joe Bushkin
Saxophone - Babe Russin, Bruce Snyder, Bud Freeman, Deane Kincaide, Don Lodice, Fred Stulce, Heinie Beau, Johnny Mince, Mannie Gershman, Mike Doty, Paul Mason, Skeets Herfurt
Alto Saxophone - Hymie Schertzer
Trombone - Dave Jacobs, Elmer Smithers, George Arus, Les Jenkins, Lowell Martin, Moe Zudekoff, Red Bone (2), Tommy Dorsey, Ward Silloway
Trumpet - Al Steams, Andy Ferretti, Bunny Berigan, Charles Peterson, Charlie Spivak, Chuck Peterson, Clyde Hurley, Jimmy Blake, Joe Bauer, Lee Castaldo, Mickey Bloom, Pee Wee Erwin, Ray Linn, Tommy Dorsey, Yank Lawson, Ziggy Elman

References

Tommy Dorsey albums